Polygraph is a film by Canadian director Robert Lepage, released in 1996.

The film stars Marie Brassard as Lucie Champagne, an actress who is given the role of Marie-Claire in a film dramatizing a real-life murder, and Patrick Goyette as François, Lucie's former boyfriend who was Marie-Claire's neighbour and is a suspect in the real crime. The film's cast also includes Josée Deschênes, Maria de Medeiros, Peter Stormare, Marie-Christine Lê-Huu and Richard Fréchette.

Awards
The film garnered nine Genie Award nominations at the 17th Genie Awards, including Best Motion Picture, Best Director (Lepage), Best Actress (Brassard), Best Supporting Actress (Deschênes, de Medeiros), Best Adapted Screenplay (Lepage, Brassard), Best Cinematography (Guy Dufaux), Overall Sound (Jo Caron, Claude Hazanavicius, Hans Peter Strobl and John Nestorowich) and Sound Editing (Jean-Pierre Pinard, Jérôme Décarie, Serge Fortin, Raymond Vermette, Mario Rodrigue and Jacques Plante).

External links

1996 films
Canadian drama films
Films directed by Robert Lepage
French-language Canadian films
1990s Canadian films